Sara Hamdi Masoud is a Qatari Paralympic athlete. She represented Qatar at the 2016 Summer Paralympics held in Rio de Janeiro, Brazil and she won the silver medal in the women's shot put F33 event. She is the first female Paralympic athlete to win a medal at the Paralympic Games for Qatar.

At the 2017 World Para Athletics Championships held in London, United Kingdom, she won the silver medal in the women's shot put F33 event. She also competed in this event at the 2019 World Para Athletics Championships held in Dubai, United Arab Emirates where she finished in 8th place.

In 2018, she won the silver medal in the women's shot put F33 event at the 2018 Asian Para Games held in Jakarta, Indonesia.

Achievements

References

External links 
 

Living people
Year of birth missing (living people)
Place of birth missing (living people)
Athletes (track and field) at the 2016 Summer Paralympics
Medalists at the 2016 Summer Paralympics
Paralympic silver medalists for Qatar
Paralympic medalists in athletics (track and field)
Qatari female shot putters